Connor James Ripley (born 13 February 1993) is an English professional footballer who plays as a goalkeeper for League One club Morecambe.

He began his professional career at his local team Middlesbrough, going on to depart on eight individual loan spells. These included multiple spells at various English clubs as well as Motherwell in Scotland and Östersund in Sweden. During this time, he represented England at under-19 and under-20 levels.

Early life
Born in Middlesbrough, Ripley is the son of former player Stuart Ripley.

Club career

Middlesbrough
Ripley began his career with Blackburn Rovers. After moving to Middlesbrough in 2009, he signed a two-and-a-half-year professional contract in January 2011. Ripley made his professional debut on 5 March 2011 in a 5–2 loss to Reading, conceding three goals after coming on as a substitute for Jason Steele. Ripley made his full debut on 14 January 2012, in a 2–0 loss at home to Burnley.

Oxford United loan
He then went out on an emergency loan to Oxford United, after both their goalkeepers had suffered injuries. Ripley made his only appearance for Oxford United, in which he conceded a goal from Ryan Hall's free kick, in a 2–0 loss against Southend United the next day. After this, manager Chris Wilder was unhappy with Ripley's performance and decided to terminate his loan spell at the club. After returning to Middlesbrough, Ripley became the third-choice goalkeeper around the 2012–13 season and in January 2013 signed a new contract with the club.

Bradford City loan
He moved on loan to Bradford City in August 2013, and later spoke about his hope of extending the month-long deal. In September 2013 the deal was extended until January 2014. The loan deal ended in January 2014.

Östersund loan
On 3 March 2014, Ripley joined Swedish side Östersund, playing in the Superettan for the remainder of the 2014 season. Ripley went on to make fourteen appearances for the club, having faced competition from Peter Augustsson and Aly Keita. Upon his return to Middlesbrough in October 2014, Ripley was praised by Peter Beardsley.

Motherwell loan
On 31 July 2015, Ripley moved on loan to Scottish Premiership club Motherwell until January 2016. He made his debut the following day, in a 1–0 win against Inverness Caledonian Thistle.

Oldham Athletic loan
Ahead of the 2016–17 season, Ripley was sent out on loan again, agreeing a season-long move to League One club Oldham Athletic on 9 July 2016.

Burton Albion loan
Despite being considered for the first-choice goalkeeper spot at Middlesbrough, he moved on loan to Burton Albion in August 2017.

Bury loan
Having returned from his loan from Burton prematurely, he departed once again and signed on loan for Bury in January 2018.

Accrington Stanley loan
He moved on loan to Accrington Stanley in August 2018.

Preston North End
In January 2019, Ripley signed for fellow Championship club Preston North End, signing a three-and-a-half-year contract. He moved on an emergency loan to League Two team Salford City on 16 October 2021, and kept a clean-sheet on his debut the same day, a 2–0 win against Hartlepool United. Ripley was released by the club at the end of the 2021–22 season.

Morecambe
In June 2022 it was announced that Ripley would sign for Morecambe on 1 July 2022. On 1 November 2022, Ripley saved two penalties as his side earned a 1–1 draw with Derby County, also making crucial saves in Morecambe's further two matches as he was awarded the EFL League One Player of the Month award for November 2022.

International career

Under-19s
On 7 October 2011, Ripley made his debut for the England U19s in the 1–0 win against Portugal during the Limoges Tournament in France. Two days later, he replaced Jamal Blackman in the 3–1 against Ukraine as England won the tournament. Ripley made two further appearances before being named in the squad for the 2012 UEFA European Under-19 Championship in Estonia. He didn't feature in the tournament as England reached the semi-finals.

Under-20s
On 28 May 2013, he was named in manager Peter Taylor's 21-man squad for the 2013 FIFA U-20 World Cup. He made his debut on 16 June, in a 3–0 win in a warm-up game against Uruguay.

Personal life
He has one son, born in August 2016.

Career statistics

Honours
Individual
EFL League One Player of the Month: November 2022

References

1993 births
Living people
Footballers from Middlesbrough
English footballers
England youth international footballers
Association football goalkeepers
Blackburn Rovers F.C. players
Middlesbrough F.C. players
Oxford United F.C. players
Bradford City A.F.C. players
Östersunds FK players
Motherwell F.C. players
Oldham Athletic A.F.C. players
Burton Albion F.C. players
Bury F.C. players
Accrington Stanley F.C. players
Preston North End F.C. players
English Football League players
English expatriate footballers
English expatriate sportspeople in Sweden
Expatriate footballers in Sweden
Superettan players
Scottish Professional Football League players
Salford City F.C. players
Morecambe F.C. players